is a term used in the Japanese theatrical form kabuki to refer to young adult male roles, and to the actors who play those roles. Though not all tachiyaku roles are heroes, the term does not encompass roles such as villains or comic figures, which form their own separate categories. The hero or chief protagonist of a kabuki play is nearly always a tachiyaku role, and the head of a troupe or acting family typically specializes in these roles.

The term, which literally means "standing role", once was used to refer to all actors, to distinguish them from musicians and chanters, who were called .

There are two main types of tachiyaku role:

 Aragoto: Most of the great heroes of the kabuki tradition are characters performed in the aragoto style. Their face makeup is white with bold red patterns, and their words and actions are likewise quite bold. It takes great training to create, and sustain, the loud and forceful voice of an aragoto character. The chief example of an aragoto role is that of Kamakura Gongorō Kagemasa in the famous play Shibaraku.
 Wagoto: Wagoto roles are softer, gentler, characters. A wagoto figure is often a companion to the chief aragoto role in the play, or a romantic character. Abe Kiyoyuki in Narukami Fudō Kitayama Zakura and Yoshitsune in Kanjinchō are examples of wagoto roles.

There are also a number of lesser categories of tachiyaku roles, including shinbōya (mild-mannered characters who are defined by their suffering great cruelty, usually at the hands of the play's villain) and sabakiyaku (level-headed, wise, and thoughtful characters, often serving as judges or the like). These are lesser roles, very rarely if ever serving as the chief protagonist or hero of a play.

While there are a number of onnagata (female role specialists) who are particularly famous, most of the other top actors of both past and present specialize(d) in tachiyaku roles. This includes the lineages of Ichikawa Danjūrō, Ichikawa Ebizō, Nakamura Kanzaburō, Onoe Kikugorō, and many others.

Notable Tachiyaku
 Bandō Mitsugorō VIII
 Ichikawa Danjūrō I
 Ichikawa Danjūrō II
 Ichikawa Danjūrō VII
 Ichikawa Danjūrō VIII
 Ichikawa Ebizō XI
 Ichikawa Jūkai III 
 Ichikawa Sadanji III
 Ichikawa Udanji III
 Ichimura Uzaemon XVII 
 Kataoka Ainosuke VI
 Kataoka Nizaemon XIII
 Kataoka Nizaemon XV 
 Matsumoto Hakuō I
 Matsumoto Hakuō II
 Matsumoto Kōshirō VII
 Matsumoto Kōshirō X
 Morita Kan'ya XIV
 Nakamura Ganjirō II
 Nakamura Kankurō VI
 Nakamura Kanzaburō XVII
 Nakamura Kanzaburō XVIII 
 Nakamura Kichiemon II
 Nakamura Shichinosuke II
 Nakamura Shidō II
 Nakamura Tomijūrō V
 Onoe Kikugorō V
 Onoe Kikugorō VII
 Onoe Shoroku II
 Sakata Tōjūrō I
 Sakata Tōjūrō IV

References

Kabuki